This is an incomplete list of the paintings by the Danish-French Impressionist artist Camille Pissarro (1830–1903).

The catalog numbers of the listed works are as given in the Catalogue Raisonné of the Wildenstein Institute.

1852–1856 (St Thomas, West Indies)

1857–1866 (Paris)

1866–1868 (Pontoise)

1869–1870 (Louveciennes)

1870–1871 (London)

1871–1872 (Louveciennes)

1872–1882 (Pontoise)

1882–1884 (Osny)

1884–1898 (Eragny-sur-Epte)

See also
La Petite Fabrique 1862–1865
The Banks of the Oise near Pontoise 1873
A Cowherd at Valhermeil, Auvers-sur-Oise 1874
Côte des Bœufs at L'Hermitage, 1877
The Harvest, Pontoise 1881
The House of the Deaf Woman and the Belfry at Eragny 1886
Shepherdess Bringing in Sheep 1886
Morning, An Overcast Day, Rouen 1896
Pont Boieldieu in Rouen, Rainy Weather, 1896
Steamboats in the Port of Rouen, 1896
Le Boulevard de Montmartre, Matinée de Printemps, 1897
Boulevard Montmartre, Mardi Gras 1897
Rue Saint-Honoré, dans l'après-midi. Effet de pluie 1897
The Garden of the Tuileries on a Winter Afternoon 1899
Hay Harvest at Éragny, 1901

References

Pissarro, Camille